The City Council of Omaha, Nebraska, is elected every four years on a nonpartisan basis. The next election will occur in 2025. Omaha has a strong mayor form of government. Members are elected by district. Currently seven city council districts are represented across the City of Omaha.

Membership
City council members represented seven districts throughout the city of Omaha.

The City Council is  officially nonpartisan; party affiliations are for informational purposes only. However, registered Democrats hold a majority.

Additional seats

In 2006 the Nebraska State Legislature began deliberations on adding additional seats to the Omaha City Council. Due to the annexation of Elkhorn by Omaha, the City Council has proposed new boundaries for the districts that would split Elkhorn between two districts. Legislative Bill 405, introduced by Elkhorn State Senator Dwite Pedersen, would increase the size of the Omaha City Council to 9 members and realign districts. However, this bill was tabled in March 2007 until the next legislative session.

First Omaha City Council 
The first Omaha City Council was convened in 1857. It was composed of A. D. Jones, who resigned March 23, 1857; T. G. Goodwill, who died May 18, 1857; G. C. Bove, H. H. Visscher, Thomas Davis, William N. Byers, William W. Wyman, Thomas O'Connor, C. H. Downs, J. H. Kellom, for whom Kellom School was later named; and John Creighton, whom Creighton University was later named for.

The City Council has long taken stances on issues. In 1859 a local newspaper reported that a, "...bill introduced in the Omaha City Council, for the abolition of slavery in this Territory, was called up yesterday, and its further consideration postponed for two weeks. A strong effort will be made among the Republicans to secure its passage; we think, however, it will fail. The farce certainly cannot be enacted if the Democrats do their duty."

Notes

References

See also
 Landmarks Heritage Preservation Commission
 Government of Omaha

Omaha City Council
City councils in the United States
1857 establishments in Nebraska Territory
Government agencies established in 1857
Government of Omaha, Nebraska